Liucija Vaitukaitytė (born 24 April 2000) is a Lithuanian professional footballer who currently plays as a midfielder for Italian Serie A club Parma. She previously played in Italy for Pomigliano and in Spain for Granadilla, Sevilla and Racing Santander. She made her debut for the Lithuania women's national team in 2015.

Career
Vaitukaitytė has been capped for the Lithuania national team, appearing for the team during the 2019 FIFA Women's World Cup qualifying cycle.  She made her senior debut in 2015.

In December 2020 Vaitukaitytė was the only female Lithuanian footballer to be playing professionally outside the country. She was named Lithuanian Footballer of the Year in February 2021 and in January 2022.

International goals

References

External links
 
Liucija Vaitukaitytė - Youtube 
 
 
Liucija Vaitukaitytė at Sevilla FC
Liucija Vaitukaitytė at Lietuvos Futbolas
Liucija Vaitukaitytė at Kauno Žalgiris
Liucija Vaitukaitytė FK ,,Gintra-universitetas''

2000 births
Living people
Women's association football midfielders
Lithuanian women's footballers
Lithuania women's international footballers
Gintra Universitetas players
Primera División (women) players
UD Granadilla Tenerife players
Sevilla FC (women) players
Segunda Federación (women) players
CDE Racing Féminas players
Lithuanian expatriate footballers
Lithuanian expatriate sportspeople in Spain
Expatriate women's footballers in Spain
Serie A (women's football) players
Lithuanian expatriate sportspeople in Italy
Expatriate women's footballers in Italy
Parma Calcio 2022 players